Mount Colombo is a mountainous projection in the northeast part of the main massif of the Fosdick Mountains, standing  north of Mount Richardson in the Ford Ranges, Marie Byrd Land. It was discovered by the Byrd Antarctic Expedition on the Eastern Flight of December 5, 1929, and named for Louis P. Colombo, a member of the biological party of the United States Antarctic Service which visited this area in December 1940.

References 

Mountains of Marie Byrd Land
Mountains